Robert Leslie Harrison (22 June 1939 – 7 January 2022) was an English drummer and singer who was best known as an early member of the progressive rock band Procol Harum.

Life and career
Harrison was born in East Ham, London, on 22 June 1939. He was an early member of Procol Harum, but shortly after their 1967 hit single "A Whiter Shade of Pale" was released, he and guitarist Ray Royer left the group to form the band Freedom. He also worked with several other members of Procol Harum on other projects; he joined a band called SNAFU which contained Procol's future organist Pete Solley, and also on Matthew Fisher's solo album Journey's End. His 1977 self-titled project album Nobody's Business was released only in Japan.

He was later in a band called 'Journey', where he played Christian-oriented rock around the Leigh-on-Sea area of Essex. He died on 7 January 2022, at the age of 82.

References

External links
Bobby Harrison Official
Bobby Harrison's fan page at Procolharum.com
 
 

1939 births
2022 deaths
English rock drummers
People from East Ham
Procol Harum members